Saïan Supa Crew was a French hip hop collective that was composed of three bands: Explicit Samouraï, OFX and Simple Spirit. It formed in 1997 and separated in 2007 after the departure of one of its leaders (along with Feniksi), Leeroy Kesiah. The name Saïan Supa was a reference to the Super Saiyan from the manga and anime Dragon Ball Z/GT.

Saïan Supa Crew produced a very musical style of hip hop with hints of chanting, reggae, dancehall, zouk and ragga. Beat boxing also was an integral part of their music, as well as classic disco, for example, "Ring My Bell" was partially revisited on its album KLR; bossa nova, as heard on the song KLR, salsa, in À Demi Nue, and even bits of classical music, in La Preuve par 3 and intros of various other songs.
The variety and originality of their music, and their energic style brought them international recognition. In their home country, the song Angela was a huge hit in 2000 and sold 600,000 copies.

Their first album released in 1999, KLR, bears the name of one of its members who died in a car crash in April 1998, a few months after the collective had formed and before they would achieve success. It contains a song of the same name entirely dedicated to him.

Their primary themes extend from drug problems ("Que Dit-On?") to racism ("La Preuve par 3"), including also relationships ("À Demi Nue"), suicide ("La Dernière Séance") and the justification of violence by religion ("Au Nom de Quoi"). Humor and seriousness were both at home in their lyrics.

Their second album, X Raisons, was awarded a Victoire de la musique in 2002 for Best Rap/Groove album.

Most of the groups of the collective have solo albums out as well. OFX was the first to debut, with their album Roots in February 2004, followed shortly by Explicit Samouraï in January 2005 and later by Sir Samuël Vizé pli ô, whose solo album was released in April 2005.

The last album from the Saïan Supa Crew, Hold Up, was released Halloween 2005. On this album, the group demonstrated their breadth with three featured artists: German singer Patrice on "96 Degreez," the singer Camille on "Si J'avais Su," and will.i.am of The Black Eyed Peas on "La Patte."

Saïan Supa Crew contributed a short rap section on the song "Flight Tonight" by the Avalanches, which appears on their 2000 debut album, Since I Left You.

Members
 Leeroy Kesiah member of Explicit Samouraï (born in 1978 as Khalid Dehbi, Bagneux 92) Left the group shortly before its dissolution in 2007.
 Vicelow member of OFX (born in 1978 as Cédric Bélise, Bondy 93)
 Sly the Mic Buddha member of Simple Spirit (born in 1974 as Silvere Johnson, Montrouge 92)
 Feniksi member of OFX (born in 1976 as Samuël Adebiyi, Noisy-le-Sec 93)
 Specta member of Explicit Samouraï (born in 1975 as Gérard Nubul, Bagneux 92) Left the group in 2003.
 Sir Samuël (born in 1977 as Fabien Philetas, Sarcelles 95)
 KLR member of OFX (Montfermeil 93) Died in 1998.
DJ Fun, Alsoprodby, Eddy Kent and DJ Kärve also regularly contributed at different points.

Discography
 Saïan Supa Land (EP) (1998)
 Saïan Supa Crew (EP) (1999)
 KLR (1999)
 L'Block Présente (EP) (2000)
 X Raisons (2001)
 Da Stand Out (EP) (2002)
 Hold-Up (2005)
 DVD Hold-Up Tour 2006 (2006) + Live DVD directed by J.G Biggs

Music videos
 1999 : "Y'a-t-il un Père pour Sauver les Rênes ?"
 2000 : "Raz de Marée"
 2000 : "Angela"
 2000 : "Y'a" directed by Matthieu Kassovitz
 2001 : "La Preuve par 3"
 2001 : "X Raisons"
 2002 : "Soldat" directed by J.G Biggs
 2002 : "À Demi Nue"
 2003 : "J'ai Dit" directed by J.G Biggs
 2005 : "La Patte" (feat. will.i.am) directed by J.G Biggs
 2005 : "Jacko"

French hip hop groups
Musical collectives
Virgin Records artists